Scopula dhofarata is a moth of the  family Geometridae. It is found in Oman and Saudi Arabia.

References

Moths described in 1986
dhofarata
Moths of Asia